Harris Goodwin Cope (March 16, 1880 – September 24, 1924) was an American football and baseball player and football coach. He served as the head football coach at Sewanee: The University of the South in Sewanee, Tennessee from 1909 to 1916 and Howard College—now known as Samford University—in Marion, Alabama from 1922 to 1923, compiling a career [[college football coaching record of 48–28–12. Cope was a member of the National Football Rules Committee in 1914–15.

Early life and playing career
Cope first played at the Taft School in Watertown, Connecticut.

Sewanee

In his first year of varsity football, Cope was a substitute quarterback on the undefeated "Iron Men" of the 1899 Sewanee Tigers football team. He was the captain and the starting quarter for Sewanee's 1901 team.

Cope played third baseman on the Sewanee baseball team.

Coaching career
Cope worked for a short time as a business man in Cartersville before returning to Sewanee to coach in 1909. For many years, he returned to Cartersville during the off-seasons to manage the Cartersville Colts semi-professional men’s baseball team.

Sewanee
Cope has the third-most wins of any Sewanee coach (43), behind Shirley Majors' 93 and John Windham's 45; and has the highest winning percentage of any Sewanee coach who coached for more than 3 seasons. His continuity came after a period in which Sewanee had much talent but six coaches in seven years.

1909
In Cope's first year at head coach he led the Sewanee Tigers to a Southern Intercollegiate Athletic Association (SIAA) championship in 1909, beating previous season's champion LSU and handing Vanderbilt its first loss to a Southern team in six years.

Howard
Former Sewanee player Bob Taylor Dobbins assisted Cope at Howard.
Cope was also a very astute golfer, playing in club tournaments during his off-seasons.

Death
Cope died of pneumonia in Birmingham, Alabama, on September 24, 1924, just before the start of Howard's football season.

Legacy
Cope's disciples include:
 Bob Taylor Dobbins, played for Sewanee (1913–1915), assistant for Howard (1922–1923)
 Frank Faulkinberry, played for Sewanee (1907–1910), head coach for Middle Tennessee State (1926–1932)
 Jenks Gillem, played for Sewanee (1910–1912), head coach for Howard (1925–1926), Birmingham–Southern (1928–1939), head coach for Sewanee (1940–1941)
 Frank Juhan, played for Sewanee (1908–1910), assistant for Sewanee (1913–1915)
 Henry D. Phillips, assistant for Sewanee (1909–1915)
 Silas Williams, played for Sewanee (1908–1909), assistant for Sewanee (1914–1915), head coach for Chattanooga (1919–1921)

Head coaching record

References

External links
 

1880 births
1924 deaths
19th-century players of American football
American football quarterbacks
Baseball third basemen
Samford Bulldogs athletic directors
Samford Bulldogs football coaches
Sewanee Tigers athletic directors
Sewanee Tigers baseball players
Sewanee Tigers football coaches
Sewanee Tigers football players
Taft School alumni
Coaches of American football from Georgia (U.S. state)
Players of American football from Savannah, Georgia
Baseball players from Savannah, Georgia
Deaths from pneumonia in Alabama